La Rivière-Drugeon is a commune in the Doubs department in the Bourgogne-Franche-Comté region in eastern France.

Population

Transportation
The commune has a railway station, on the Frasne–Les Verrières line.

See also
 Communes of the Doubs department

References

Communes of Doubs